Siân Gwenllian is a Welsh Plaid Cymru politician who has represented the constituency of Arfon in the Senedd since 2016. She currently holds the seat with a majority of 8,642 votes. 

Since the 2021 Senedd election, Gwenllian has been Plaid Cymru's spokesperson for the Welsh Language, Education, Children and Young People. She is also the Chief Whip and Deputy Leader of Plaid Cymru's shadow cabinet. 

She previously held the portfolio for Local Government, the Welsh Language, Equalities and Planning in Plaid's shadow cabinet in the 5th Senedd. She was also a member of the Senedd's Committee for Children, Young People and Education, Finance Committee and the Senedd's Business Committee.

In 2018, she became co-deputy leader of Plaid Cymru alongside fellow Ynys Môn AM Rhun ap Iorwerth. Upon her appointment by leader Adam Price, Siân Gwenllian stated that, "I'm proud to be a member of this group of talented and skilled individuals and look forward to working together as a collective as we move towards the project of building a New Wales".

Siân was also appointed as an Assembly Commission Commissioner in November 2018 and was  responsible for official languages and the delivery and transformation of services to Assembly Members.

She previously served as a councillor on Gwynedd Council, representing Y Felinheli. Between 2010 and 2012 she was responsible for the authority's finance portfolio. Between 2012 and 2014 she was Cabinet Member for Education, lead on children and young people, and was deputy leader of the Council. In 2014, she was appointed Gwynedd Small Business Champion, responsible for promoting this sector of the economy in Gwynedd.

She was educated at Friars School, Bangor and at Aberystwyth and Cardiff universities. She was then a journalist with the BBC and HTV in Bangor before becoming a county councillor for Y Felinheli, the village where she was brought up.

References

1956 births
Living people
Plaid Cymru members of the Senedd
Female members of the Senedd
Wales MSs 2016–2021
Wales MSs 2021–2026
People educated at Friars School, Bangor
Alumni of Aberystwyth University
Alumni of Cardiff University
People from Gwynedd
Welsh-speaking politicians